The 2004 Cal State Fullerton Titans baseball team represented California State University, Fullerton in the 2004 NCAA Division I baseball season. The Titans played their home games at Goodwin Field. The team was coached by George Horton in his 8th season at Cal State Fullerton.

The Titans won the College World Series, defeating the Texas Longhorns and former Titans head coach Augie Garrido in the championship series.

Roster

Schedule 

! style="background:#FF7F00;color:#004A80;"| Regular Season (36–20)
|- valign="top" 

|- align="center" bgcolor="#ffdddd"
| January 30 || at No. 6  || No. 8 || Sunken Diamond || 3–16 || Schreppel (L; 0–1) || 2,103 || 0–1 || –
|- align="center" bgcolor="#ffdddd"
| January 31 || at No. 6 Stanford || No. 8 || Sunken Diamond || 7–8 || Romero (L; 0–1) || 2,437 || 0–2 || –
|-

|- align="center" bgcolor="#ffdddd"
| February 1 || at No. 6 Stanford || No. 8 || Sunken Diamond || 1–4 || Gagnier (L; 0–1) || 1,637 || 0–3 || –
|- align="center" bgcolor="#ddffdd"
| February 6 ||  || No. 8 || Goodwin Field || 9–8 || Sarver (W; 1–0) || 1,876 || 1–3 || –
|- align="center" bgcolor="#ddffdd"
| February 7 || UNLV || No. 8 || Goodwin Field || 13–1 || Romero (W; 1–1) || 1,646 || 2–3 || –
|- align="center" bgcolor="#ddffdd"
| February 8 || UNLV || No. 8 || Goodwin Field || 14–6 || Gagnier (W; 1–1) || 2,010 || 3–3 || –
|- align="center" bgcolor="#ffdddd"
| February 13 || at No. 22 Arizona || No. 8 || Sancet Stadium || 8–11 || Pestano (L; 0–1) || 871 || 3–4 || –
|- align="center" bgcolor="#ffdddd"
| February 14 || at No. 22 Arizona || No. 8 || Sancet Stadium || 6–10 || Romero (L; 1–2) || 1,358 || 3–5 || –
|- align="center" bgcolor="#ddffdd"
| February 15 || at No. 22 Arizona || No. 8 || Sancet Stadium || 12–10 || M. Martinez (W; 1–0) || 1,683 || 4–5 || –
|- align="center" bgcolor="#ffdddd"
| February 20 || at  || No. 15 || Cougar Field || 2–3 || Windsor (L; 0–1) || 1,203 || 4–6 || –
|- align="center" bgcolor="#ddffdd"
| February 21 || at Houston || No. 15 || Cougar Field || 11–0 || Romero (W; 2–2) || 1,743 || 5–6 || –
|- align="center" bgcolor="#ddffdd"
| February 22 || at Houston || No. 15 || Cougar Field || 9–4 || Schreppel (W; 1–1) || 1,513 || 6–6 || –
|- align="center" bgcolor="#ffdddd"
| February 24 || at  || No. 20 || George C. Page Stadium || 2–3 || Sarver (L; 1–1) || 321 || 6–7 || –
|- align="center" bgcolor="#ffdddd"
| February 27 ||  || No. 20 || Goodwin Field || 1–5 || Pestano (L; 0–2) || 2,278 || 6–8 || –
|- align="center" bgcolor="#ddffdd"
| February 28 || No. 3  || No. 20 || Goodwin Field || 7–1 || Romero (W; 3–2) || 2,398 || 7–8 || –
|- align="center" bgcolor="#ddffdd"
| February 29 ||  || No. 20 || Goodwin Field || 10–4 || Gagnier (W; 2–1) || 2,768 || 8–8 || –
|-

|- align="center" bgcolor="#ffdddd"
| March 5 || at No. 3 Texas ||  || Disch-Falk Field || 2–6 || Windsor (L; 0–2) || 4,446 || 8–9 || –
|- align="center" bgcolor="#ddffdd"
| March 6 || vs.  ||  || Disch-Falk Field || 12–2 || Schreppel (W; 2–1) || 278 || 9–9 || –
|- align="center" bgcolor="#ffdddd"
| March 7 || at No. 3 Texas ||  || Disch-Falk Field || 1–3 || Romero (L; 3–3) || 5,547 || 9–10 || –
|- align="center" bgcolor="#ffdddd"
| March 9 || vs.  ||  || Goodwin Field || 4–7 || Gagnier (L; 2–2) || 821 || 9–11 || –
|- align="center" bgcolor="ddffdd"
| March 12 ||  ||  || Goodwin Field || 7–1 || Windsor (W; 1–2) || 1,207 || 10–11 || –
|- align="center" bgcolor="ffdddd"
| March 13 || Minnesota ||  || Goodwin Field || 7–8 || M. Martinez (L; 1–1) || 1,413 || 10–12 || –
|- align="center" bgcolor="ddffdd"
| March 14 || Minnesota ||  || Goodwin Field || 10–2 || Pestano (W; 1–2) || 1,643 || 11–12 || –
|- align="center" bgcolor="ddffdd"
| March 17 || at  ||  || Eddy D. Field Stadium || 9–8 || M. Martinez (W; 2–1) || 119 || 12–12 || –
|- align="center" bgcolor="ffdddd"
| March 19 || at  ||  || Pete Beiden Field || 5–7 || Windsor (L; 1–3) || 2,582 || 12–13 || –
|- align="center" bgcolor="ddffdd"
| March 20 || at Fresno State ||  || Pete Beiden Field || 15–5 || Romero (W; 4–3) || 2,408 || 13–13 || –
|- align="center" bgcolor="ddffdd"
| March 21 || at Fresno State ||  || Pete Beiden Field || 12–9 || M. Martinez (W; 3–1) || 2,423 || 14–13 || –
|- align="center" bgcolor="ddffdd"
| March 24 || Pepperdine ||  || Goodwin Field || 6–0 || Bruyninckx (W; 1–0) || 1,017 || 15–13 || –
|- align="center" bgcolor="ffdddd"
| March 31 || Southern California ||  || Dedeaux Field || 4–6 || M. Martinez (L; 3–2) || 551 || 15–14 || –
|-

|- align="center" bgcolor="ffdddd"
| April 2 || No. 13  ||  || Goodwin Field || 2–6 || Windsor (L; 1–4) || 3,317 || 15–15 || –
|- align="center" bgcolor="ffdddd"
| April 3 || No. 13 Long Beach State ||  || Goodwin Field || 1–10 || Schreppel (L; 2–2) || 1,859 || 15–16 || –
|- align="center" bgcolor="ddffdd"
| April 4 || No. 13 Long Beach State ||  || Goodwin Field || 9–3 || Romero (W; 5–3) || 2,585 || 16–16 || –
|- align="center" bgcolor="ddffdd"
| April 8 || at  ||  || Klein Family Field || 16–1 || Windsor (W; 2–4) || 338 || 17–16 || 1–0
|- align="center" bgcolor="ddffdd"
| April 9 || at Pacific ||  || Klein Family Field || 13–0 || Romero (W; 6–3) || 247 || 18–16 || 2–0
|- align="center" bgcolor="ddffdd"
| April 10 || at Pacific ||  || Klein Family Field || 13–5 || Pestano (W; 2–2) || 331 || 19–16 || 3–0
|- align="center" bgcolor="ddffdd"
| April 13 || Loyola Marymount ||  || Goodwin Field || 12–1 || Schreppel (W; 3–2) || 934 || 20–16 || –
|- align="center" bgcolor="ddffdd"
| April 16 ||  ||  || Goodwin Field || 3–2 || Windsor (W; 3–4) || 1,091 || 21–16 || 4–0
|- align="center" bgcolor="ddffdd"
| April 17 || Cal State Northridge ||  || Goodwin Field || 10–3 || Romero (W; 7–3) || 1,010 || 22–16 || 5–0
|- align="center" bgcolor="ddffdd"
| April 18 || Cal State Northridge ||  || Goodwin Field || 4–3 || Pestano (W; 3–2) || 1,874 || 23–16 || 6–0
|- align="center" bgcolor="ffdddd"
| April 20 ||  ||  || Goodwin Field || 4–5 || Pestano (L; 3–3) || l,479 || 23–17 || –
|- align="center" bgcolor="ddffdd"
| April 23 || at  ||  || Caesar Uyesaka Stadium || 8–0 || Windsor (W; 4–4) || 273 || 24–17 || 7–0
|- align="center" bgcolor="ddffdd"
| April 24 || at UC Santa Barbara ||  || Caesar Uyesaka Stadium || 9–2 || Romero (W; 8–3) || 303 || 25–17 || 8–0
|- align="center" bgcolor="ffdddd"
| April 25 || at UC Santa Barbara ||  || Caesar Uyesaka Stadium || 7–14 || Sarver (L; 1–2) || 371 || 25–18 || 8–1
|- align="center" bgcolor="ddffdd"
| April 30 ||  ||  || Goodwin Field || 3–2 || Windsor (W; 5–4) || 1,243 || 26–18 || 9–1
|-

|- align="center" bgcolor="ddffdd"
| May 1 || Cal Poly ||  || Goodwin Field || 27–2 || Romero (W; 9–3) || 1,579 || 27–18 || 10–1
|- align="center" bgcolor="ddffdd"
| May 2 || Cal Poly ||  || Goodwin Field || 9–4 || M. Martinez (W; 4–2) || 1,127 || 28–18 || 11–1
|- align="center" bgcolor="ddffdd"
| May 7 ||  ||  || Goodwin Field || 12–3 || Windsor (W; 6–4) || 1,632 || 29–18 || 12–1
|- align="center" bgcolor="ffdddd"
| May 8 || UC Riverside ||  || Goodwin Field || 4–6 || Romero (L; 9–4) || 1,520 || 29–19 || 12–2
|- align="center" bgcolor="ddffdd"
| May 9 || UC Riverside ||  || Goodwin Field || 11–4 || M. Martinez (W; 5–2) || 1,043 || 30–19 || 13–2
|- align="center" bgcolor="ffdddd"
| May 11 || at UCLA ||  || Jackie Robinson Stadium || 2–8 || Bruyninckx (L; 1–1) || 327 || 30–20 || –
|- align="center" bgcolor="ddffdd"
| May 14 || at  ||  || Cicerone Field || 3–0 || Windsor (W; 7–4) || 1,572 || 31–20 || 14–2
|- align="center" bgcolor="ddffdd"
| May 15 || at UC Irvine ||  || Cicerone Field || 11–1 || Romero (W; 10–4) || 1,579 || 32–20 || 15–2
|- align="center" bgcolor="ddffdd"
| May 16 || at UC Irvine ||  || Cicerone Field || 7–3 || M. Martinez (W; 6–2) || 1,610 || 33–20 || 16–2
|- align="center" bgcolor="ddffdd"
| May 21 || at No. 11 Long Beach State || No. 23 || Blair Field || 2–1 || Windsor (W; 8–4) || 3,036 || 34–20 || 17–2
|- align="center" bgcolor="ddffdd"
| May 22 || at No. 11 Long Beach State || No. 23 || Blair Field || 2–1 || Romero (W; 11–4) || 2,037 || 35–20 || 18–2
|- align="center" bgcolor="ddffdd"
| May 23 || at No. 11 Long Beach State || No. 23 || Blair Field || 13–11 || M. Martinez (W; 7–2) || 2,168 || 36–20 || 19–2
|-

|-
! style="background:#FF7F00;color:#004A80;"| Post-Season (11–2)
|-
|-

|- align="center" bgcolor="ddffdd"
| June 4 || vs. (3) Minnesota || No. 13 (2) || Goodwin Field || 7–1 || Windsor (W; 9–4) || 3,211 || 37–20 
|- align="center" bgcolor="ffdddd"
| June 5 || vs. (4) Pepperdine || No. 13 (2) || Goodwin Field || 6–7 || Schreppel (L; 3–3) || 2,520 || 37–21 
|- align="center" bgcolor="ddffdd"
| June 5 || vs. No. 18 (1)  || No. 13 (2) || Goodwin Field || 5–0 || M. Martinez (W; 8-2) || 1,392 || 38–21 
|- align="center" bgcolor="ddffdd"
| June 6 || vs. (4) Pepperdine || No. 13 (2) || Goodwin Field || 15–1 || Sarver (W; 2–2) || 1,867 || 39–21 
|- align="center" bgcolor="ddffdd"
| June 6 || vs. (4) Pepperdine || No. 13 (2) || Goodwin Field || 16–3 || Windsor (W; 10–4) || 1,567 || 40–21 
|-

|- align="center" bgcolor="ddffdd"
| June 12 || vs. No. 14  || No. 5 || Goodwin Field || 9–0 || Windsor (W; 11–4) || 3,375 || 41–21 
|- align="center" bgcolor="ddffdd"
| June 13 || vs. No. 14 Tulane || No. 5 || Goodwin Field || 10–7 || Romero (W; 12–4) || 2,720 || 42–21 
|-

|- align="center" bgcolor="ddffdd"
| June 19 || vs. No. 7 (2) South Carolina || No. 4 || Rosenblatt Stadium || 2–0 || Windsor (W; 12–4) || 23,976 || 43–21
|- align="center" bgcolor="ddffdd"
| June 20 || vs. No. 1 (3) Miami (FL) || No. 4 || Rosenblatt Stadium || 6–3 || Romero (W; 13–4) || 24,857 || 44–21
|- align="center" bgcolor="ffdddd"
| June 23 || vs. No. 7 (2) South Carolina || No. 4 || Rosenblatt Stadium || 3–5 || M. Martinez (L; 8–3) || 28,216 || 44–22
|- align="center" bgcolor="ddffdd"
| June 24 || vs. No. 7 (2) South Carolina || No. 4 || Rosenblatt Stadium || 4–0 || Sarver (W; 3–2) || 16,251 || 45–22
|- align="center" bgcolor="ddffdd"
| June 26 || vs. No. 2 (1) Texas || No. 4 || Rosenblatt Stadium || 6–4 || Romero (W; 14–4) || 26,604 || 46–22
|- align="center" bgcolor="ddffdd"
| June 27 || vs. No. 2 (1) Texas || No. 4 || Rosenblatt Stadium || 3–2 || Windsor (W; 13–4) || 21,392 || 47–22
|-

Awards and honors 
Felipe Garcia
 College World Series All-Tournament Team

Clark Hardman
 All-America Freshman
 All-Big West First Team

Ricky Romero
 College World Series All-Tournament Team

Kurt Suzuki
 Brooks Wallace Award
 Johnny Bench Award
 All-America First Team
 Big West Player of the Year
 All-Big West First Team

Jason Windsor
 College World Series Most Outstanding Player
 All-America Second Team
 Big West Pitcher of the Year
 All-Big West First Team

Titans in the 2004 MLB Draft 
The following members of the Cal State Fullerton Titans baseball program were drafted in the 2004 Major League Baseball Draft.

References 

Cal State Fullerton
Cal State Fullerton Titans baseball seasons
College World Series seasons
NCAA Division I Baseball Championship seasons
Big West Conference baseball champion seasons
Cal State Fullerton
Fullerton Titans